"Hope" is a song by Australian singer David Campbell. It was released as his debut single and peaked at 8 on the ARIA Charts.

Track listing
CD single (Columbia – 673978.2)
 "Hope"
 "Waiting"
 "Hope" (acoustic)

Charts

References

2003 debut singles
2003 songs
CBS Records singles
Songs written by Steve Mac
Song recordings produced by Steve Mac
Songs written by Rob Davis (musician)